Joseph Hartwell Williams (February 15, 1814 – July 19, 1896) was an American politician who served as the 27th  Governor of Maine from 1857 to 1858.

Early years 
Williams was born in Augusta (in modern-day Maine, then a part of Massachusetts) on February 15, 1814. He graduated from Harvard University in 1830. He also studied at Dane Law School in Cambridge.

Politics 
Williams was a Democrat. In 1854, he switched his political allegiance and become a Republican. He became a member and president of the Maine State Senate in 1857. Hannibal Hamlin, the Governor of Maine at the time, resigned on February 25, 1857, to accept the position of United States Senator. Williams, president of the senate at the time, became the new governor of the state. He completed the term of Hannibal Hamlin. He left office on January 6, 1858.

Later years 
After leaving office, Williams served as a member of the Maine House of Representatives from 1864 to 1866. He was re-elected as an independent to the Maine House of Representatives in 1873. He held that position for two years. He ran for governorship in 1873, but he was unsuccessful. He then practiced law. He died on July 19, 1896.

Sources 
 Sobel, Robert and John Raimo. Biographical Directory of the Governors of the United States, 1789-1978. Greenwood Press, 1988. 

1814 births
1896 deaths
Governors of Maine
Harvard Law School alumni
Politicians from Augusta, Maine
Maine Democrats
Maine Independents
Maine Republicans
Members of the Maine House of Representatives
Presidents of the Maine Senate
Republican Party governors of Maine
19th-century American politicians